Single-stranded DNA-binding protein, mitochondrial is a protein that in humans is encoded by the SSBP1 gene.

Function 

SSBP 1 is a housekeeping gene involved in mitochondrial biogenesis (Tiranti et al., 1995).[supplied by OMIM]

See also
SSBP4

References

Further reading